Each "article" in this category is a collection of entries about several stamp issuers, presented in alphabetical order. The entries are formulated on the micro model and so provide summary information about all known issuers.  

See the :Category:Compendium of postage stamp issuers page for details of the project.

Poland 

Dates 	1918 –
Capital 	Warsaw
Currency 	(1918) 100 fenigs = 1 mark
		(1918) 100 hellers = 1 crown
		(1924) 100 groszy = 1 zloty

Main Article Needed 

Includes 	Poland (Russian Province)

See also 	General Gouvernement;
		German Occupation Issues (WWI);
		German Occupation Issues (WWII)

Poland (German Occupation WWI) 

Dates 	1915 – 1918
Currency 	100 pfennige = 1 mark

Refer 	German Occupation Issues (WWI)

Poland (German Occupation WWII) 

Dates 	1939 – 1945
Currency 	100 groszy = 1 zloty

Refer 	German Occupation Issues (WWII)

Poland (Russian Province) 

Dates 	1860 – 1863
Capital 	Warsaw
Currency 	100 kopecks = 1 Russian ruble

Refer 	Poland

Polish Army in Russia 

Dates 	1942 only
Currency 	100 kopecks = 1 Russian ruble

Refer 	Polish Post Abroad

Polish Corps in Russia 

Dates 	1918 only
Currency 	100 kopecks = 1 Russian ruble

Refer 	Polish Post Abroad

Polish Government in Exile 

Dates 	1941 – 1945
Currency 	100 groszy = 1 zloty

Refer 	Polish Post Abroad

Polish Military Post 

Refer 	Central Lithuania (Polish Occupation);
		Polish Army in Russia;
		Polish Corps in Russia

Polish Occupation Issues 

Refer 	Polish Post Abroad

Polish Post Abroad 

Main Article Needed 

Includes 	Central Lithuania (Polish Occupation);
		Constantinople (Polish Post Office);
		Danzig (Polish Post Office);
		Polish Army in Russia;
		Polish Corps in Russia;
		Polish Government in Exile

Polska 

Refer 	Poland

Pondicherry 

Refer 	French Indian Settlements

Ponta Delgada 

Dates 	1892 – 1905
Currency 	1000 reis = 1 milreis

Refer 	Azores Territories

Poonch 

Dates 	1876 – 1894
Currency 	12 pies = 1 anna; 16 annas = 1 rupee

Refer 	Indian Native States

Port Arthur & Dairen 

Dates 	1946 – 1950
Currency 	100 cents = 1 dollar

Refer 	CPR Regional Issues

Port Gdansk 

Refer 	Danzig (Polish Post Office)

Port Lagos (French Post Office) 

French PO in Thrace when under Turkish rule.  Issued French stamps overprinted PORT-LAGOS.  The office
closed in 1898.  Port Lagos is a seaport in Western Thrace which now belongs to Greece.

Dates 	1893 – 1898
Currency  	100 centimes = 1 franc

Refer 	French Post Offices in the Turkish Empire

Port Said (French Post Office) 

Dates 	1899 – 1931
Currency  	(1899) 100 centimes = 1 franc
		(1921) 1000 milliemes = 1 pound

Refer 	Egypt (French Post Offices)

Portugal 

Dates 	1853 –
Capital 	Lisbon
Currency 	(1853) 1000 reis = 1 milreis
		(1912) 100 centavos = 1 escudo
		(2002) 100 cent = 1 euro

Main Article Needed 

See also 	Africa (Portuguese Colonies);
		Angola;
		Azores;
		Cape Verde Islands;
		Guinea–Bissau;
		Macao;
		Madeira;
		Mozambique;
		Portuguese Congo;
		Portuguese Guinea;
		Portuguese India;
		Sao Tome e Principe;
		Timor

Portuguese Africa 

Refer 	Africa (Portuguese Colonies)

Portuguese Congo 

Dates 	1894 – 1920
Capital 	Cabinda
Currency 	(1894) 1000 reis = 1 milreis
		(1912) 100 centavos = 1 escudo

Main Article Needed 

See also 	Africa (Portuguese Colonies)

Portuguese Guinea 

Dates 	1881 – 1974
Capital 	Bissau
Currency 	(1881) 1000 reis = 1 milreis
		(1912) 100 centavos = 1 escudo

Main Article Needed 

See also 	Africa (Portuguese Colonies);
		Guinea–Bissau

Portuguese India 

Portugal sought territory in India after Vasco da Gama's successful voyage round the Cape of Good Hope
in 1497–1498.  The three enclaves of Goa (1505), Damao (1531) and Diu (1534) were annexed to collectively form the colony of Portuguese India.

Goa, including the capital Pangim (now Panaji), is on the Malabar Coast of SW India, roughly midway between
Bombay and Bangalore.  Damao (now called Daman) is on the west coast, at the entrance to the Gulf of Cambay, about 100 miles north of Bombay.  Diu, which includes the towns of Diu and Simbor, is a small island
(15 sq. miles) off the south coast of Kathiawar peninsula in western India.

The first stamps were issued 1 October 1871.  Stamps of British India were also valid until 1877.
Standard Portuguese types such as the Ceres issue were used until 1925 when specific types began to
be produced.  All stamps were inscribed INDIA in some way; from 1946, the inscription was usually
ESTADO DA INDIA.

In 1950, newly independent India demanded the transfer of the Portuguese territories but Portugal
refused.  India set up a land blockade in 1954 and then annexed the territories on 17 December 1961.
Stamps of India were introduced on 29 December 1961.

Goa became a State of India in 1987 while Daman and Diu (combined) is a Union Territory.

Dates 	1871 – 1961
Capital 	Pangim (Goa)
Currency 	(1871) 1000 reis = 1 milreis
		(1882) 12 reis = 1 tanga; 16 tangas = 1 rupia
		(1959) 100 centavos = 1 escudo

Main Article  Postage stamps and postal history of Portuguese India

Portuguese Occupation of German East Africa 

Refer 	German East Africa (Portuguese Occupation)

Portuguese Timor 

Refer 	Timor

Preussen 

Refer 	Prussia

Priamur & Maritime Provinces 

Dates 	1921 – 1922
Capital 	Vladivostok
Currency 	100 kopecks = 1 Russian ruble

Refer 	Russian Civil War Issues

Prince Edward Island 

Dates 	1861 – 1873
Capital 	Charlottetown
Currency 	(1861) 12 pence = 1 shilling; 20 shillings = 1 pound
		(1872) 100 cents = 1 dollar

Refer 	Canadian Provinces

Protectorat Français 

Refer 	French Protectorate, Morocco

Prussia 

Dates 	1850 – 1867
Capital 	Berlin
Currency 	(1850) 12 pfennige = 1 silbergroschen; 30 silbergroschen = 1 thaler
		(1867) 60 kreuzer = 1 gulden

Main Article Needed 

See also 	Germany (Imperial);
		North German Confederation

Puerto Rico 

Dates 	1873 – 1900
Capital 	San Juan
Currency 	(1873) 100 centimos = 1 peseta
		(1881) 1000 milesimas = 100 centavos = 1 peso
		(1898) 100 cents = 1 dollar

Main Article Needed 

See also 	Cuba & Puerto Rico

Pulau Pinang 

Refer 	Penang

Puttiala 

Refer 	Patiala

References

Bibliography
 Stanley Gibbons Ltd, Europe and Colonies 1970, Stanley Gibbons Ltd, 1969
 Stanley Gibbons Ltd, various catalogues
 Stuart Rossiter & John Flower, The Stamp Atlas, W H Smith, 1989
 XLCR Stamp Finder and Collector's Dictionary, Thomas Cliffe Ltd, c.1960

External links
 AskPhil – Glossary of Stamp Collecting Terms
 Encyclopaedia of Postal History

Poland